

371001–371100 

|-bgcolor=#f2f2f2
| colspan=4 align=center | 
|}

371101–371200 

|-bgcolor=#f2f2f2
| colspan=4 align=center | 
|}

371201–371300 

|-id=220
| 371220 Angers ||  || Angers is a city in western France about 300 kilometers southwest of Paris. || 
|}

371301–371400 

|-bgcolor=#f2f2f2
| colspan=4 align=center | 
|}

371401–371500 

|-bgcolor=#f2f2f2
| colspan=4 align=center | 
|}

371501–371600 

|-bgcolor=#f2f2f2
| colspan=4 align=center | 
|}

371601–371700 

|-bgcolor=#f2f2f2
| colspan=4 align=center | 
|}

371701–371800 

|-bgcolor=#f2f2f2
| colspan=4 align=center | 
|}

371801–371900 

|-bgcolor=#f2f2f2
| colspan=4 align=center | 
|}

371901–372000 

|-bgcolor=#f2f2f2
| colspan=4 align=center | 
|}

References 

371001-372000